Kevin Stanley Curran (10 December 1920 – 20 April 1978) was an Australian rules footballer who played for Hawthorn in the VFL during the 1940s. 

Curran was recruited to Hawthorn from Traralgon and played his first game with them in 1940. A rover, he made his debut in a game against Fitzroy but internal disputes over his selection ensured that it would be the only time he appeared in the season. Instead of staying on at Hawthorn he enlisted in the army, fighting against the Japanese in Dili. 

In 1946 he made a return to Hawthorn and the following season represented Victoria at the Hobart Carnival, the first on 9 interstate appearances during his career. He won Hawthorn's best and fairest award in 1948, also winning the Simpson Medal for his performance against West Australian in an interstate game.

Bob McCaskill replaced Alec Albiston as coach at the start of 1950. Albiston was told by a committeeman that he would be appointed captain. But McCaskill wanted a more physical leader, and he decided that Curran was just the man. Albiston was stunned by the appointment and a split occurred at the club.  Albiston and Col Austen, the reigning Brownlow Medallist, were sacked and given open clearances.
 
Curran got reported in just the third match of the season, getting a four-match suspension
His return was against Richmond, Col Austen’s new club  and everyone knew he was out to get Austen that day at Glenferrie Oval. Eventually he lined him up from 40 yards away and hit him. He was suspended for another four matches. 

He resigned as captain after two seasons, he accepted an offer to captain-coach the Sandhurst Football Club in Bendigo at the beginning of 1952.  He was the Bendigo league’s best and fairest (Michelsen Medal) in his first season.

He became a publican and ran the Fleece Inn Hotel in Bendigo. He helped recruit local Bendigo boys Graham Arthur, Brendan Edwards and Des Dickson to Hawthorn. Curran himself signed Edwards after two  officials made the mistake of calling in at Curran’s hotel and asking for direction to Edward's place, Curran gave them bad directions then he rushed off and signed the schoolboy.

Honours and achievements
Individual
 Hawthorn best and fairest: 1948
 Hawthorn captain: 1950–1951
 Hawthorn life member

References

External links

Hawksheadquarters profile

1920 births
Australian rules footballers from Victoria (Australia)
Hawthorn Football Club players
Peter Crimmins Medal winners
Sandhurst Football Club players
Traralgon Football Club players
1978 deaths
Australian Army personnel of World War II
People from Traralgon
Military personnel from Victoria (Australia)